Secret Warriors is a 2009 comic book ongoing series published by Marvel Comics, the series focuses mainly on Nick Fury and his secret teams (Team White being one off), which the title is referencing to as well as members of other hidden groups, such as the ones from Hydra. The series was written by Brian Michael Bendis and Jonathan Hickman, with art by Stefano Caselli. The series ran for 28 issues and ended in 2011.

Publication history
The series has been published in several collected editions, two for each storyline with one version in hardcover and the other in trade paperback format. The hardcover for the first storyline was published with the tagline: "The greater sin is doing nothing when you could be giving everything...of dreaming too small. I will be the ONE MAN."

Plot
The series focuses on Nick Fury and his secret teams who are meant to combat Hydra who have infiltrated the spy agency S.H.I.E.L.D.

Roster

 Nick Fury
 Quake
 Hellfire
 Druid
 Phobos
 Stonewall

Reception
The series holds an average rating of 7.7 by 128 professional critics on the review aggregation website Comic Book Roundup.

Prints

Issues

Collected editions

References

External links
 
 

2009 comics debuts
2011 comics endings
Nick Fury titles
Comics by Jonathan Hickman